The International Mobile Satellite Organization (IMSO) is the intergovernmental organization that oversees certain public satellite safety and security communication services provided via the Inmarsat satellites. Some of these services concern:

 Global Maritime Distress Safety System (GMDSS) established by the International Maritime Organization (IMO)
 Search and rescue co-ordinating communications
Maritime safety information (MSI) broadcasts
 Aeronautical mobile satellite (route) service, or AMS(R)S, through compliance with the Standards and Recommended Practices (SARPs) established by the International Civil Aviation Organization (ICAO)
 General communications

History

INMARSAT
The International Maritime Satellite Organization (INMARSAT) was established under the auspices of the International Maritime Organization by the Convention on the International Maritime Satellite Organization, signed at London on 3 September 1976 and entered into force on 16 July 1979. The organization was modeled after Intelsat, an international consortium which provided satellite communications among the member countries. The Communications Satellite Corporation (COMSAT), a founding member of Intelsat, took the lead in the founding of Inmarsat. In coordination with the International Civil Aviation Organization in the 1980s, the convention governing INMARSAT was amended to include improvements in aeronautical communications, notably for public safety.

The first Director General was appointed in January 1980 and operations began in 1982. Olof Lundberg, who had previously managed and developed mobile and specialized services at Swedish Telecom (now Telia), served as Director General and CEO until 1995.

IMSO
In the mid-1990s, there was contrasting views among member states for the agency's future. There was a growing realization among the member states that the organization's business assets needed to be privatized, mainly because of the competitive nature of the satellite communication industry and the unwillingness of many member states to invest money into INMARSAT to improve its network. There were also many which believed in the importance of maintaining the organization's role in overseeing maritime satellite communication. The issue was resolved in a session in April 1998, which resulted in the amendment of the Convention on the International Mobile Satellite Organization, in which the operational assets would be split and privatized while the agency would continue as a regulatory organization.

On 15 April 1999, INMARSAT became the International Mobile Satellite Organization (IMSO). At the time, the operational assets of INMARSAT were separated to become Inmarsat Ltd., a private UK-based company which agreed to inherit, overseen by the IMSO, certain public safety obligations related to the satellite system's operation.

An agreement between the International Civil Aviation Organization (ICAO) and the IMSO was signed in Montreal, Canada, on 20 September 2000 and addresses the relationship between ICAO and IMSO. As of November 2018, Inmarsat has 103 state parties that represent approximately 95 per cent of the gross tonnage of the world's merchant fleet.

References

External links
 Official website of IMSO

Aviation safety
Communications satellite operators
Emergency communication
Emergency management
Intergovernmental organizations established by treaty
International organisations based in London
Maritime safety
Organisations based in the London Borough of Islington
Organizations established in 1979
Satellite telephony
1979 establishments in England

zh:国际移动卫星组织